Colin Walsh may refer to:

 Colin Walsh (baseball) (born 1989), American baseball player
 Colin Walsh (footballer) (born 1962), Scottish footballer
 Colin Walsh (organist), English organist

See also 
 Colin Walshe (born 1990), Gaelic footballer